Nuvola is a free software icon set under the GNU LGPL 2.1 license, created by David Vignoni. Originally created for desktop environments like KDE and GNOME, it is also available in packages for Windows and Mac. The final version, 1.0, contains almost 600 icons. The default set is in the PNG graphics format; an SVG version is also available.

The application icons, in particular, colourfully represent a wide variety of commonplace and easily recognised objects.

Uses 
Besides KDE and GNOME, Nuvola is used by the Pidgin instant messaging client, the Amarok media player and the KeePass password manager.
Nuvola is the default icon set on the OpenLab GNU/Linux distribution.
It is also used for many purposes on Wikimedia Foundation projects.

Examples of icons

See also 

Bluecurve – former default GPL icon set of Fedora
Crystal – LGPL icon set by Everaldo Coelho
Icon (computing)
Openclipart
Oxygen Project – LGPL icon set for KDE
Palette (computing)
Tango Desktop Project – developers of a public domain icon set
Theme (computing)

References

External links

 Nuvola Icon Theme version 1.0, the official package distribution which contains the original KDE 3 compatible version of Nuvola
 Nuvola page on David Vignoni website Official source for original Nuvola packages and future development
 gnome-themes-extras, a package which contains a GNOME SVG version of Nuvola

Computer icons
Free software projects
Free system software
KDE
GNOME